Dan Biton (born 20 July 1995) is an Israeli professional footballer who plays as an attacking midfielder for Maccabi Tel Aviv.

Early life
Biton was born in Beersheba, Israel, to a family of Sephardic Jewish descent.

Club career

Hapoel Be'er Sheva
Biton made his debut for Hapoel Be'er Sheva against Maccabi Petah Tikva in Toto Cup, in September 2014.

During the 2014\15 Season, He played in The youth academy of Hapoel Be'er Sheva, Except some games that he was included in the reserves of the Senior team.

In the 2015\16 season, new coach Barak Bakhar gave Biton more minutes; He started in the team's loss To Hapoel Acre, came in as a sub against Maccabi Petah Tikva And Assisted Maharan Radi's Goal (H. Be'er Sheva won 5–2) and later would in the season came in as a sub against Kiryat Shmona, Assisting John Ogu's winning goal at the 90th minute.

F.C. Ashdod
Biton was loaned to F.C. Ashdod for two years. He scored his debut club goal in the 1–3 loss to Hapoel Haifa.
In August 2017, Biton would officially leave H. Be'er Sheva after he was acquired by F.C. Ashdod and then signed a long-term contract with the club.

PFC Ludogorets Razgrad
In June 2019, Biton signed with the Bulgarian side Ludogorets Razgrad.

Career statistics

Club

Honours
Hapoel Beer Sheva
 Israeli Premier League: 2015–16
 Israel Super Cup: 2016

Ludogorets
Bulgarian First League: 2019–20
Bulgarian Supercup: 2019

Maccabi Tel Aviv
 Toto Cup: 2020-21

References

External links
 

1995 births
Living people
Israeli Sephardi Jews
Israeli footballers
Hapoel Be'er Sheva F.C. players
F.C. Ashdod players
PFC Ludogorets Razgrad players
Maccabi Tel Aviv F.C. players
Israeli Premier League players
First Professional Football League (Bulgaria) players
Israeli expatriate footballers
Expatriate footballers in Bulgaria
Israeli expatriate sportspeople in Bulgaria
Footballers from Beersheba
Israeli people of Moroccan-Jewish descent
Association football midfielders
Israeli Mizrahi Jews